Artesia Beach is an unincorporated community in the town of Calumet, Fond du Lac County, Wisconsin, United States.

Notes

Unincorporated communities in Fond du Lac County, Wisconsin
Unincorporated communities in Wisconsin